Group C of the 1996 Fed Cup Europe/Africa Zone Group II was one of four pools in the Europe/Africa zone of the 1996 Fed Cup. Four teams competed in a round robin competition, with the top two teams advancing to the play-offs.

Israel vs. Estonia

Luxembourg vs. Zimbabwe

Luxembourg vs. Estonia

Zimbabwe vs. Macedonia

Israel vs. Zimbabwe

Luxembourg vs. Macedonia

Israel vs. Macedonia

Estonia vs. Zimbabwe

Israel vs. Luxembourg

Estonia vs. Macedonia

See also
Fed Cup structure

References

External links
 Fed Cup website

1996 Fed Cup Europe/Africa Zone